The Saint John of Sahagun Parish Church, locally known as the Candon Church, is a church situated in the city of Candon, Ilocos Sur, Philippines. Constructed with an Earthquake Baroque design, the church is maintained and is still being used up to present.

History
In 1591, the Augustinians accepted Candon as a house while Father Pedro Bravo, OSA initiated building one of the early churches in 1695. It was severely damaged in the 1707 earthquake that struck the country, but was rebuilt under the supervision of Father Jose Carbonel, OSA until 1710, and Father Diego del Castillo, OSA until 1713.

Features
It is said to be the longest religious painting in the Philippines. Father Vincente Avila, his cousin Mel Andino (an arts teacher), and Andino's student Redentor Castillo were the brains and hands behind the paintings, and was unveiled December 2007.

References

External links

Roman Catholic churches in Ilocos Sur
Churches in the Roman Catholic Archdiocese of Nueva Segovia